Ermac is a fictional character in the Mortal Kombat fighting game franchise by Midway Games and NetherRealm Studios. Debuting as an unlockable character in Ultimate Mortal Kombat 3 (1995), he is an amalgam of the souls of deceased warriors and possesses telekinetic abilities.

The character originated from rumors alleging he appeared in the original 1992 game as either a glitch or a hidden character, which were perpetuated by video game magazine Electronic Gaming Monthly (EGM). His name was derived from a diagnostics menu in the first game that displayed the text "error macro" as ERMACS. Although the rumors were false, growing interest led to him becoming an official playable character.

Ermac has appeared in other Mortal Kombat media such as the animated series Mortal Kombat: Defenders of the Realm and the web series Mortal Kombat: Legacy. He has received positive reception for his special abilities, character development, and Fatality finishing moves, while his origins are considered among the most memorable legends of video gaming.

History and conception
In the diagnostics menu of the 1992 original Mortal Kombat game, an audits screen displayed a macro that had been created by Mortal Kombat co-creator and programmer Ed Boon in order to catch coding errors. This practice had been employed by series developer Midway Games since their 1990 arcade release Smash TV. It was spelled as ERMACS—a pluralized contraction of error macro—as in the number of times the program would execute. In early revisions of the game, it appeared on the audits screen beneath a counter titled "Shang Tsung Beaten" (in reference to the game's final boss fight). However, when Boon added the hidden character Reptile into the third revision, ERMACS was listed on the menu below the counters "Reptile Appearances" and "Reptile Battles", which provoked players into searching for a second secret character called Ermac.

Midway removed the ERMACS listing from the game's fifth and final update in March 1993, but speculation about the character intensified after Electronic Gaming Monthly (EGM) published a submitted screenshot from the first Mortal Kombat game and a letter from "Tony Casey" that claimed he had played against a red ninja named Ermac and taken a Polaroid of the screen as evidence. Unbeknownst to the magazine, the photo was a doctored image of yellow ninja character Scorpion in a victory pose on the "Warrior Shrine" stage from the Super Nintendo version of the game, tinted red and with a superimposed center-screen phrase that read "Ermac Wins". Reader responses printed two issues later contained varying complex instructions for accessing the character. With the still-nonexistent Ermac now visualized as a red ninja, players claimed sightings of a random glitch that would cause the game's ninja characters' graphics to flash red, with "Error Macro" or "Ermac" replacing their name in their energy bar. However, such an occurrence was not possible as the macro counter could not increase in the event of a genuine glitch, while no red palette for the character existed.

Though Midway included a scrambled message in the 1993 sequel Mortal Kombat II that read "Ermac does not exist", neither Boon nor Midway marketing director Roger Sharpe denied outright the character's presence in the game. In October 1995, two years after the EGM incident, Ermac was added to the selectable roster of Ultimate Mortal Kombat 3 (1995; an upgrade of Mortal Kombat 3), as the developers felt that he had transformed from myth to urban legend and therefore warranted his inclusion in the series. Boon clarified the rumors on Twitter in 2011, and said he had kept the meaning of the ERMACS listing secret in hopes of stirring up fan speculation about the character.

NetherRealm Studios (formerly Midway Games) has inserted allusions to the rumors and EGM hoax in subsequent Mortal Kombat games and related media. Ermac appeared on one panel in a Mortal Kombat II comic book prequel that was written and illustrated by Mortal Kombat co-creator John Tobias and published by the company in 1994. Mortal Kombat: Deception's training mode contained a message that read, "It is a little-known fact that 'Ermac' is short for 'Error Macro'", an homage to his origins that was revived in Mortal Kombat X for a pre-match introduction sequence between Ermac and series newcomer Takeda. He was an Easter egg boss hidden at the Warrior Shrine level in Mortal Kombat: Shaolin Monks, a 2005 beat 'em up spinoff title that spans the events of Mortal Kombat II. Skarlet, a nonexistent female ninja character from MKII with a similar background, was included by NetherRealm Studios as a playable character in the 2011 reboot game in what the company considered a second instance of turning fan rumors into reality.

Design and portrayal

Ermac was played by actor John Turk in the digitized games Ultimate Mortal Kombat 3 and the 1996 compilation title Mortal Kombat Trilogy. As a palette-swapped character, he was physically identical to the Mortal Kombat games' other male ninjas, save for his red coloring and darker skin tone. For Mortal Kombat: Deception, which marked Ermac's return to the series as a playable character after an eight-year absence, he was given a distinct redesign by Steve Beran, the series' lead character designer and art director. Beran explained that his objective of remaking old characters was to greatly differentiate them from their previous incarnations. His Deception design was maintained for the 2011 reboot game, but with an increased black palette.

For Mortal Kombat X, Ermac was designed with a slimmer figure and his mask exposing more of his face, revealing decaying skin. According to NetherRealm Studios, his emaciated appearance is the result of his losing control of the souls inside his body, with a metal talisman modeled after his chest design from Deception affixed to his chest in order to keep his physical form intact. The talisman initially covered his face, "securely nailed deep into the skull", in concept artwork by character artist Justin Murray. Early designs by Murray had Ermac unmasked with a stockier figure and a solid black palette. Ermac's "Inner Workings" Fatality (a finishing move that executes defeated opponents) in the game has him levitate his opponent, break their spine in midair, and then telekinetically pull their gastrointestinal tract out from their mouth. The finisher was conceived by the game's lead designer, John Edwards: "I remember sitting in the pitch meeting for it. People were like, 'That's hilarious and disgusting.' I'm pretty proud of it." Sound effects used in depicting the graphic violence of his finishers were created with slime and a plunger.

Gameplay
Ermac was the lone player character in Ultimate Mortal Kombat 3 who had not appeared in any previous Mortal Kombat games, and he was one of three hidden characters who were selectable after they were unlocked by players. As a palette swap, Ermac had a standard projectile attack, while sharing Scorpion's teleport-punch move and Smoke's uppercut-decapitation Fatality. His characteristic special move is the "Telekinetic Slam", which has him levitate his opponents and then slam them onto the ground; it has become his signature attack in the Mortal Kombat series. Ed Boon considered Ermac one of the strongest characters in UMK3 on the basis of the maneuver, and GamePro opined that it was best used on downed opponents. The staff of BradyGames considered Ermac a "great choice for the advanced player" in MK Trilogy, but felt his offense was ineffective in close range and easily nullified by using the block button.

His main fighting style in Deception and Mortal Kombat: Armageddon is Choy Lay Fut, a martial art that specializes, as depicted in his Deception ending, in warding off multiple attackers. GameSpy considered his combo (a timed succession of attacks) abilities "strong" in Deception, but felt his special moves were less effective when used individually. In Mortal Kombat: Shaolin Monks, Ermac is a boss hidden inside a statue at the Warrior Shrine level. GameFront's Mitchell Saltzman described Ermac in the 2011 Mortal Kombat reboot game as a novice-friendly character that experts could use to inflict heavy-damage combos. In Mortal Kombat X, Ermac floats across the playfield instead of walking, and his play style is split into three fighting variations like those of the game's other playable characters. Bryan Dawson of Prima Games wrote that the character was ideal for distance fighting and pressuring downed opponents.

Appearances

In video games
Ermac is an amalgam of the souls of deceased warriors, crafted to serve as an enforcer for Shao Kahn, the evil emperor of the otherworldly dimension of Outworld. The concentration of souls results in his possessing telekinetic powers and referring to himself in plural form. In Ultimate Mortal Kombat 3 (UMK3), which expanded on the plot of Mortal Kombat 3 to accommodate the upgrade's new characters, Ermac emerges from hiding to prove his existence by participating in Kahn's invasion of Earthrealm and in the third tournament.

He disappears from the series continuity until Mortal Kombat: Deadly Alliance (2002), in which Shao Kahn is killed along with series protagonist Liu Kang by the evil sorcerers Shang Tsung and Quan Chi, but Ermac remains under his control and wanders Outworld without instructions until an encounter with blind swordsman Kenshi, who breaks him free of Kahn's spell out of pity. As a token of gratitude, Ermac teaches Kenshi the Telekinetic Slam.

In Mortal Kombat: Deception (2004), Ermac becomes a force for good to atone for his crimes committed in Kahn's name. He allies himself with the spirit of Liu Kang and helps free the imprisoned souls of his friends—Johnny Cage, Jax, Sonya Blade, Kitana, and Kung Lao—who had been killed by the Deadly Alliance and then resurrected and controlled by the game's main boss character, the Dragon King Onaga. In a subplot that was not explored further in the series, he then senses that Onaga is being controlled by an unseen, more powerful influence. In the game's training mode that is set before the main storyline, Ermac is dispatched to the Netherrealm by Shao Kahn to defeat the demon Ashrah, but since he is bound by magic, the dark realm drains his powers. He encounters the game's protagonist Shujinko, who locates the monolithic "Soul Stone" that restores his strength, and Ermac trains Shujinko as compensation. When Ermac confronts Ashrah, she wrongly believes he also is a demon and seeks to kill him, but he defeats her.

Ermac fights alongside the Earthrealm heroes in the opening cinematic sequence of the 2006 compilation game Mortal Kombat: Armageddon, in which a battle royal commences among the combatants at the Pyramid of Argus in the fictional realm of Edenia. He and Nightwolf are overpowered by Sheeva until Kenshi intervenes, and after Quan Chi attacks Kenshi, Ermac hurls Quan Chi off the pyramid but stomps on Kenshi before revealing himself as Shang Tsung in disguise. Midway created a computer-animated concept biography showing Ermac performing a kata routine over the soundtrack of a voiceover of his Deception biography, but he was not among the seventeen characters who received an official biography for Armageddon and he therefore played no part in the storyline.

He returns to his original role of Shao Kahn's enforcer in Mortal Kombat, the 2011 reboot of the continuity of the first three titles, and is present at the Shaolin Tournament from the first game, where he is beaten by Liu Kang. In the game's revised storyline, he uses his telekinetic powers to obliterate Jax's arms, causing Jax to receive bionic arm implants. In his ending, it is revealed that one of the souls trapped inside Ermac's being is that of Edenian ruler King Jerrod, Sindel's husband and Kitana's father, who asserts control over the warring souls after Kahn is killed.

Ermac plays a supporting role in the plot of Mortal Kombat X (2015), in which he remains loyal to Shao Kahn's successors to the Outworld throne, first Mileena and then Kotal Kahn as they fight for the realm's rule in the midst of a civil war. He ultimately sides with Kotal Kahn upon the revelation that Mileena is not the true heir to the throne, as she is a genetic creation and not Shao Kahn's biological daughter. Ermac joins forces with Kotal Kahn, Reptile, Erron Black, and Ferra/Torr, and during a battle between the Outworlders and Cassie Cage's Special Forces unit, he is immune to Kenshi's son Takeda's telepathy due to the cacophony of souls inside his body, but he is then beaten by Takeda. Near the conclusion, Jax's daughter Jacqui Briggs exacts revenge on Ermac for destroying her father's arms when she defeats him in combat. In his ending, Ermac returns to Shao Kahn's abandoned fortress in search of a voice summoning him when his souls are suddenly consumed by a resurrected Shang Tsung, leaving Ermac in a weakened state. He additionally appears in the closing panel of Kotal Kahn's ending as one of Kahn's chosen warriors (alongside Reptile, Erron Black, and Ferra/Torr) who fight in Mortal Kombat every decade in attempt to regain Kahn's Outworld sovereignty from Raiden.

Other appearances

Ermac appeared in two episodes of the 1996 animated series Mortal Kombat: Defenders of the Realm.

He has a minor role in the 1997 feature film Mortal Kombat: Annihilation, in which he was played by assistant stunt coordinator John Medlen and is identified by name only in the closing credits. Though the script and print media publications such as SciFi Entertainment and Black Belt mentioned his telekinetic powers, they were not seen in the film.

His association with Kenshi in Mortal Kombat: Deadly Alliance was loosely adapted for two episodes in the 2013 second season of director Kevin Tancharoen's Mortal Kombat: Legacy web series. Under Shao Kahn's orders, he serves as the guardian of "the sword of Sento" that is hidden inside a cave, and strikes Kenshi blind when he attempts to take the sword. The following episode shows Ermac battling Kenshi in the Mortal Kombat tournament in attempt to repossess the sword before Kenshi fatally impales him with the weapon. Ermac was played by stuntman and martial artist Kim Do Nguyen, and he was depicted as a decaying, hooded demon outfitted in a tattered black robe, with his makeup designed by Christien Tinsley.

Ermac briefly appears in the novelization of Mortal Kombat: Annihilation, and he plays a supporting role in several issues of DC Comics' 2015 Mortal Kombat X comic miniseries that is set before the events of the game. The character was licensed in 2011 as part of a set of action figures by toy manufacturer Jazwares, and a life-sized standee by Advanced Graphics. Syco Collectibles released a limited-edition (250 units) eighteen-inch polystone Ermac statue in 2012.

Reception

GamesRadar+ executive editor Eric Bratcher, in a 2009 Electronic Gaming Monthly retrospective, credited the magazine hoax with Ermac's addition into the Mortal Kombat series, while Mental Floss and Kotaku considered it the result of fans' enthusiasm for the character. The Escapist's William Bloodworth likened the fan reaction to Ermac to that of the MissingNo. glitch from the Pokémon franchise. Steve Watts of 1Up.com wrote in 2011 that supposed video game glitches like Ermac "go on to live as legends until the creators have no choice but to make it a reality." The staff of GameTrailers unsuccessfully attempted to access Ermac in the first game, per the reader instructions published in EGM, in an episode of their PopFiction web series that premiered at PAX Prime 2012.

Ermac has been positively received for his character development, while many gaming media outlets have rated him among the top characters of the Mortal Kombat series. GamesRadar+ commented in 2014: "This red-clad ninja might not be as iconic as Sub-Zero or Scorpion, but it's hard not to love Ermac for his ... supernatural, Sith-like powers of telekinesis." While Ermac and Mortal Kombat's other male ninjas ranked third on GamePros 2009 list of the seventeen best palette-swapped video game characters, Dan Ryckert of Game Informer wrote in 2010 that he did not want these characters, aside from Scorpion and Sub-Zero, in future series installments, while Evan Narcisse of Time described Ermac's costume update in the 2011 reboot as simply differentiating from that of Sub-Zero. Jeff Gerstmann of GameSpot felt the unlocking of Ermac in Ultimate Mortal Kombat 3 was "a hassle".

Ermac's finishing moves over his series appearances have been praised, particularly his "Pest Control" Fatality from the 2011 Mortal Kombat reboot, in which he shrinks his opponent and then crushes them underfoot. When NetherRealm Studios posted a trailer of the "Inner Workings" Fatality from Mortal Kombat X on YouTube in March 2015, it accumulated over 850,000 views in less than a month, and has garnered publicity for its graphic content. Ryan Smith of Chicago Reader spotlighted the finisher in an April 2015 article titled "Has Mortal Kombat Finally Gone Too Far?", describing it as "an act of medieval torture as imagined by Tolkien." Justin Clark of GameSpot wrote in 2022 that the Fatality "might actually be the most shocking, gory, and disgusting act of surreal horror to ever happen in a video game, let alone the Mortal Kombat series".

Response to Ermac's alternate-media incarnations has been negative. His appearance in Mortal Kombat: Annihilation was dismissed as "useless" by Seth Robison of Newsarama. Nathan Birch of Uproxx described him as a "forgettable red Scorpion clone" and his fight against Sonya in the film as "nondescript". Carl Lyon of Fearnet censured the character's design in Mortal Kombat: Legacy and his role therein as having "little development outside of an opponent ... that gets quickly dispatched", and while Gavin Jasper of Den of Geek noted Ermac's "pretty sweet fight scene" with Kenshi, he was also critical of his role in the episodes’ storyline.

See also
Sheng Long
Cow level

Notes

References

Extraterrestrial characters in video games
Fictional axefighters

Fictional Huaquan practitioners
Fictional henchmen in video games
Fictional telekinetics
Genetically engineered characters in video games
Male characters in video games
Mortal Kombat characters
Ninja characters in video games
Undead characters in video games
Urban legends
Video game bosses
Video game characters introduced in 1995
Video game characters who can teleport
Video game characters who have mental powers